The Summit 103 Mini Breeze is an American powered parachute, designed and produced by Summit Aerosports of Yale, Michigan.

Design and development
The Mini Breeze has a standard empty weight of  when equipped with a Rotax 447 engine and  when equipped with a Rotax 503. It features a parachute-style high-wing, single-place accommodation, tricycle landing gear and a single  Rotax 447 engine in pusher configuration. The  Rotax 503 engine is a factory option.

The Mini Breeze's airframe is built from TIG-welded, powder coated 4130 steel tubing. In-flight steering is accomplished via foot pedals that actuate the canopy brakes, creating roll and yaw. On the ground the aircraft has nosewheel steering controlled by a butterfly steering wheel and the main landing gear incorporates bungee suspension. The aircraft is factory supplied complete.

Specifications (103 Mini Breeze)

References

External links

2000s United States ultralight aircraft
Single-engined pusher aircraft
Powered parachutes